Athol Raymond Jennings (born 19 November 1930) is a South African middle-distance runner. He competed in the men's 1500 metres at the 1952 Summer Olympics.

He was later ordained as a minister in the Methodist Church of Southern Africa and in the 1970w was head of the church's education department.

He was headmaster of the Waterford Kamhlaba School in eSwatini from 1974-1984.

References

1930 births
Living people
Athletes (track and field) at the 1952 Summer Olympics
South African male middle-distance runners
Olympic athletes of South Africa
Sportspeople from Cape Town